Elizabeth Phipps Train ( – ) was an American novelist and translator.  

Elizabeth Phipps Train was born on September 1,  in Dorchester, Boston, the daughter of William G. and Mary Elizabeth Phipps Train.  She attended Wells College in Aurora, New York.

Train published a number of translations from the French, as well as original novels, some of which initially appeared in Lippincott's Monthly Magazine.  Her most famous work was A Social Highwayman, about the rise and fall of a socialite turned jewel thief named Courtice Jaffrey, narrated by his valet Jenkins Hanby.  It was adapted into a popular stage drama by Mary T. Stone in 1895, as well as a 1916 film starring Edwin August.

Train lived in Boston and Duxbury, Massachusetts. Elizabeth Phipps Train died in 1940 in Brookline, Massachusetts.

Bibliography

Novels 

 Doctor Lamar (New York : Thomas Y. Crowell & Co., [c1891])
 The autobiography of a professional beauty. (Philadelphia, J.B. Lippincott co., 1896)
 A social highwayman, (Philadelphia : J.B. Lippincott company, 1896)
 A marital liability (Philadelphia, J.B. Lippincott company, 1897), illustrated by Violet Oakley
 A queen of hearts (Philadelphia : J.B. Lippincott, 1898, c1897)
 Madam of the Ivies (Philadelphia : J.B. Lippincott, 1898)

Translations from the French 

 The apostate; a novel, by Ernest Daudet.  (New York, D. Appleton and Company, 1893)
 Recollections of the Court of the Tuileries by Amélie Carette (1899)  
 The Shadow of Roger Laroque by Jules Mary (1890)

References 

Created via preloaddraft
1856 births
1940 deaths
American women novelists
American translators
People from Dorchester, Massachusetts
Novelists from Massachusetts